Humes may refer to:
Humes, former name of Hume, Fresno County, California
Humes (surname), people with the surname Humes
Humes-Jorquenay, France
Humes High School, in Memphis, Tennessee